Phlox alyssifolia, the alyssum-leaved phlox, is a flowering plant in the genus Phlox.  It is native to central North America.

Range and habitat
Alyssum-leaved phlox is native to the grasslands of Wyoming, Montana, Nebraska, and the Dakotas.  Its range also extends into the prairie provinces of Canada.  Its preferred habitat is dry grassland.

Description
Alyssum-leaved phlox grows many tough, tufted branches that only reach 2 to 4 inches in height.  The flowers are borne on the branch tips in May.  The five-petaled flowers are white, sometimes tinted pale pink or purple.

References

alyssifolia
Flora of North America